S&W may refer to:

 S&W Cafeteria, a defunct restaurant chain in North Carolina, United States
 S&W Premium, a brand of canned beans by Del Monte Foods
 Schwartz & Wade, an imprint of the publisher Random House
 Smith & Wesson, a U.S. firearms manufacturer
 Spice and Wolf, a Japanese light novel series by Isuna Hasekura.
 The Elements of Style, a guide to written American English by William Strunk Jr. and E. B. White